
Philipp Müller-Gebhard (15 October 1889 – 2 July 1970) was a general in the Wehrmacht of Nazi Germany during World War II.  He was a recipient of the Knight's Cross of the Iron Cross.

Awards and decorations

 Knight's Cross of the Iron Cross on 3 September 1942 as Generalleutnant and commander of 72. Infanterie-Division

References

Citations

Bibliography

 

1889 births
1970 deaths
Military personnel from Heidelberg
Lieutenant generals of the German Army (Wehrmacht)
German Army personnel of World War I
Recipients of the clasp to the Iron Cross, 1st class
Recipients of the Gold German Cross
Recipients of the Knight's Cross of the Iron Cross
German prisoners of war in World War II held by the United States
People from the Grand Duchy of Baden
German Army generals of World War II